The white-browed hemispingus (Kleinothraupis auricularis) is a species of bird in the family Thraupidae. It is found in Peru. Its natural habitat is subtropical or tropical moist montane forests.

References

white-browed hemispingus
white-browed hemispingus